Roberto Nicolás Saucedo (born January 8, 1982 in Santa Fe, Argentina) is a former Argentine footballer who last played for Correcaminos UAT of the Ascenso MX. He is a naturalized citizen of Mexico.

Titles
 Mérida FC 2009 (Torneo Clausura Liga de Ascenso)
 UAT (Torneo Apertura 2011)

References

External links
 
 

1982 births
Living people
Argentine footballers
Argentine expatriate footballers
Newell's Old Boys footballers
Argentinos Juniors footballers
Deportes La Serena footballers
Club Aurora players
Irapuato F.C. footballers
Correcaminos UAT footballers
Indios de Ciudad Juárez footballers
Expatriate footballers in Chile
Expatriate footballers in Mexico
Expatriate footballers in Bolivia
Expatriate footballers in Venezuela
Naturalized citizens of Mexico
Association football forwards
Footballers from Santa Fe, Argentina